NBC 4 may refer to one of the following television stations in the United States, affiliated with the National Broadcasting Company:

Current

Owned-and-operated stations
KNBC in Los Angeles, California
WNBC in New York City, New York
WRC-TV in Washington, D.C.

Affiliate stations
KAMR-TV in Amarillo, Texas
KARK-TV in Little Rock, Arkansas
KFOR-TV in Oklahoma City, Oklahoma
KNEP in Sidney/Scottsbluff, Nebraska
KOB in Albuquerque/Santa Fe, New Mexico
KRNV-DT in Reno, Nevada
KSNB-TV in Superior/Lincoln/ Kearney, Nebraska
KTIV in Sioux City, Iowa
KVOA in Tucson, Arizona
WCMH-TV in Columbus, Ohio
WDIV-TV in Detroit, Michigan
WGCI-LD in Skowhegan, Maine
Re-broadcast of WLBZ in Augusta, Maine
WOAI-TV in San Antonio, Texas
WSMV-TV in Nashville, Tennessee
WTMJ-TV in Milwaukee, Wisconsin
WTOM-TV in Cheboygan/Sault Ste. Marie, Michigan
WTVY-DT4, a digital channel of WTVY in Dothan, Alabama
Simulcast of WRGX-LD
WYFF in Greenville/Spartanburg, South Carolina (Asheville, North Carolina)

Former
KDYL-TV/KTVT/KCPX-TV (now KTVX) in Salt Lake City, Utah (1948 to 1960)
KOA-TV/KCNC-TV in Denver, Colorado (1952 to 1995, now a CBS owned-and-operated station)
KOMO-TV in Seattle, Washington (1953 to 1959)
KOUS-TV (now KHMT) in Billings, Montana (1980 to 1987)
KPAC-TV/KJAC-TV/KBTV-TV in Beaumont/Port Arthur, Texas (1957 to 2009)
KRON-TV in San Francisco, California (1949 to 2001)
KSA-TV (via cable) in Sitka, Alaska (1959 to 1983)
KWAB-TV (now KCWO-TV) in Big Spring, Texas (1981 to 2019)
Was a satellite of KWES-TV in Midland/Odessa
WBEN-TV (now WIVB-TV) in Buffalo, New York (1948 to 1954)
WBRC in Birmingham, Alabama (1949 to 1953; now on channel 6)
WBZ-TV in Boston, Massachusetts (1948 to 1995, now a CBS owned-and-operated station)
WCIV-TV (now WGWG) in Charleston, South Carolina (1962 to 1996)
WDAF-TV in Kansas City, Missouri (1949 to 1994)
WMCT (now WMC-TV) in Memphis, Tennessee (1948 to 1952; now on channel 5)
WNBK (now WKYC) in Cleveland, Ohio (1948 to 1954; now on channel 3)
WRGB in Albany, New York (1946 to 1954; now on channel 6)
WTAR-TV (now WTKR), Norfolk, Virginia (1950 to 1952; now on channel 3)
WTTV in Indianapolis, Indiana (1954 to 1956)
WTVJ in Miami, Florida (owned-and-operated on channel 4 from 1989 to 1995; now on channel 6)